Aristeidis Dosios (1844–1881) was a Greek economist, author and banker, best known for his attempted assassination of Queen Amalia. His father was the politician Konstantinos Dosios.

References

External links
 Family sheet of the family Konstantin Dossios
 Family sheet of the family Prince Alexander Mavrocordato
 Δόσιος Κ. Αριστείδης (1844-1881) 

1844 births
1881 deaths
19th-century Greek economists
Greek bankers
Failed regicides